Robert Arthur Leeson (31 March 1928, Northwich, Cheshire – 29 September 2013) was an English author, mainly known for his children's books. Before becoming a writer, he worked as Literary Editor of the left-wing British newspaper the Morning Star.

Leeson was a prolific writer, having had more than 70 books for young people published between 1973 and 2003. His books include several historical novels, such as Beyond the Dragon Prow, about a crippled Viking boy. Leeson produced  a trilogy about a British family in the sixteenth and seventeenth centuries: Maroon Boy (1974), Bess, and The White Horse (1977). The White Horse revolves around a young man who fights on the Roundhead side during the English Civil War. Leeson also wrote The Third Class Genie (1975) (a humorous fantasy novel), and the science-fiction Time Rope (1986) and Zania Experiment (1993) series. Leeson wrote social realist novels such as It's My Life (1980), about a teenage girl who has to look after her family after her mother walks out on them. Silver's Revenge is a humorous sequel to Treasure Island, and Candy for the King is a fairytale about a giant influenced by Voltaire's Candide. Leeson's Reading and Righting: the past, present and future of Fiction for the young (1985) is a history of children's literature.  He also wrote for radio, television and the theatre.

Bibliography

 United We Stand (1971)
 Strike (1973)
 Beyond the Dragon Prow (1973)
 Maroon Boy (1974)
 The Third Class Genie (1975) 
 The Demon Bike Rider (1976)
 Children's Books and Class Society (1977)
 The White Horse (1977)
 The Cimaroons (1978)
 Challenge in the Dark (1978)
 Silver's Revenge (1978)
 Travelling Brothers (1979)
 It's My Life (1980)
 Harold and Bella, Jammy and Me (1980)
 Bess (1983)
 Candy for King (1983)
 The People's Dream (1983)
 Mum and Dad's Big Business (1983)
 Genie on the Loose (1984)
 The Adventures of Baxter and Co. (1984)
 Reading and Righting: The Past, Present and Future of Fiction for the young (1985)
 Time Rope (1986)
 Wheel of Danger (1986)
 At War With Tomorrow (1986)
 Three Against the World (1986)
 The Metro Gangs Attack (1986)
 The Reversible Giant (1986)
 Slambash Wangs of a Compo Gormer (1987)
 Never Kiss Frogs (1988)
 Burper (1989)
 How Alice Saved Captain Miracle (1989)
 Hey Robin (1989)
 Right Royal Kidnap (1990)
 Jan Alone (1990)
 Fire on the Cloud (1991)
 Coming Home (1991)
 One Frog Too Many (1991)
 Pancake Pickle (1991)
 Landing in Cloud Valley (1991)
 April Fool at Hob Lane School (1991)
 Never Kiss Frogs (1992)
 No Sleep for Hob Lane (1993)
 Karlo's Tale (1993)
 Hide And Seek (1993)
 The Last Genie (1993)
 Ghosts at Hob Lane (1993)
 Smart Girls (1993)
 Deadline (1993)
 Danger Trail (1993)
 Blast Off! (1993)
 The Dog Who Changed the World (1994)
 The Story of Robin Hood (1994)
 Swapper (1994)
 All the Gold in the World (1995)
 Red, White and Blue (1995)
 The Amazing Adventures of Idle Jack (1995)
 Smart Girls Forever (1996)
 Lucky Lad! (1997)
 Doomwater (1997)
 Geraldine Gets Lucky (1997)
 Tom's Private War (1998)
 Trwco (1998)
 Why's the Cow on the Roof? (1999)
 Liar (1999)
 The Song of Arthur (2000)
 Ruth (2000)
 My sister Shahrazad: Tales from the Arabian Nights (2001)
 Tom's War Patrol (2001)
 Tom's War (2003) (Omnibus of Tom's Private War and Tom's War Patrol).
 Partners in Crime (2003)
 Onda, Wind-Rider (2003)

TV tie-ins
 Grange Hill Rules OK? (1980).
 Grange Hill Goes Wild (1980).
 Grange Hill for Sale (1981). Novel
 Grange Hill Home and Away (1982). 
 Forty Days of Tucker J., 1983.

References

External links
 Profile at Walker Books

1928 births
2013 deaths
English children's writers
English historical novelists
English fantasy writers
English science fiction writers
English male short story writers
English short story writers
English male novelists
20th-century English novelists
20th-century British short story writers
20th-century English male writers
English male non-fiction writers
Writers of historical fiction set in the early modern period